Ostende may refer to:

 Ostend, in Dutch Oostende
 Ostende, Buenos Aires, a resort town in Pinamar Partido, Argentina
 Ostende, a hamlet in the Quarter Ende of Herdecke, Germany
 Breitenfurt-Ostende, a hamlet in Breitenfurt bei Wien, Austria
 Playa de Ostende, a beach in Castro-Urdiales, Spain; see Punta de los Cuervos

Other uses
 Ostende, a 2011 Argentine film directed by Laura Citarella
 Ostend–Vienna Express, a train that ran on the Cologne–Aachen high-speed railway from 1894 to 1993

See also
 
 Ostend (disambiguation)
 Oostende (disambiguation)
 Oosteinde, a village in North Holland
 Oosterend, North Holland